In geometry, the gyroelongated triangular bicupola is one of the Johnson solids . As the name suggests, it can be constructed by gyroelongating a triangular bicupola (either triangular orthobicupola, or the cuboctahedron) by inserting a hexagonal antiprism between its congruent halves.

The gyroelongated triangular bicupola is one of five Johnson solids which are chiral, meaning that they have a "left-handed" and a "right-handed" form. In the illustration to the right, each square face on the bottom half of the figure is connected by a path of two triangular faces to a square face above it and to the right. In the figure of opposite chirality (the mirror image of the illustrated figure), each bottom square would be connected to a square face above it and to the left.

Formulae
The following formulae for volume and surface area can be used if all faces are regular, with edge length a:

References

External links
 

Johnson solids
Chiral polyhedra